Patent visualisation is an application of information visualisation. The number of patents has been increasing steadily, thus forcing companies to consider intellectual property as a part of their strategy. Patent visualisation, like patent mapping, is used to quickly view a patent portfolio.

Software dedicated to patent visualisation began to appear in 2000, for example Aureka from Aurigin (now owned by Thomson Reuters). Many patent and portfolio analytics platforms, such as Questel, PatSnap, Patentcloud, Relecura, and Patent iNSIGHT Pro, offer options to visualise specific data within patent documents by creating topic maps, priority maps, IP Landscape reports, etc. Software converts patents into infographics or maps, to allow the analyst to "get insight into the data" and draw conclusions. Also called patinformatics, it is the "science of analysing patent information to discover relationships and trends that would be difficult to see when working with patent documents on a one-and-one basis".

Patents contain structured data (like publication numbers) and unstructured text (like title, abstract, claims and visual info). Structured data are processed by data-mining and unstructured data are processed with text-mining.

Data mining
The main step in processing structured information is data-mining, which emerged in the late 1980s. Data mining involves statistics, artificial intelligence, and machine learning. Patent data mining extracts information from the structured data of the patent document. These structured data are bibliographic fields such as location, date or status.

Structured fields

Advantages
Data mining allows study of filing patterns of competitors and locates main patent filers within a specific area of technology. This approach can be helpful to monitor competitors' environments, moves and innovation trends and gives a macro view of a technology status.

Text-mining

Principle
Text mining is used to search through unstructured text documents. This technique is widely used on the Internet, its success in bioinformatics and now in the intellectual property environment.

Text mining is based on a statistical analysis of word recurrence in a corpus. An algorithm extracts words and expressions from title, summary and claims and gathers them by declension. "And" and "if" are labeled as non-information bearing words and are stored in the stopword list. Stoplists can be specialized in order to create an accurate analysis. Next, the algorithm ranks the words by weight, according to their frequency in the patent's corpus and the document frequency containing this word. The score for each word is calculated using a formula such as:

A frequently-used word in several documents has less weight than a word used frequently in a few patents. Words under a minimum weight are eliminated, leaving a list of pertinent words or descriptors. Each patent is associated to the descriptors found in the selected document. Further, in the process of clusterization, these descriptors are used as subsets, in which the patent are regrouped or as tags to place the patents in predetermined categories, for example keywords from International Patent Classifications.

Four text parts can be processed with text-mining :
Title
Abstract
Claim
Patent Full-Text

Software offer different combinations but title, abstract and claim are generally the most used, providing a good balance between interferences and relevancy.

Advantages
Text-mining can be used to narrow a search or quickly evaluate a patent corpus. For instance, if a query produces irrelevant documents, a multi-level clustering hierarchy identifies them in order to delete them and refine the search. Text-mining can also be used to create internal taxonomies specific to a corpus for possible mapping.

Visualisations

Allying patent analysis and informatic tools offers an overview of the environment through value-added visualisations. As patents contain structured and unstructured information, visualisations fall in two categories. Structured data can be rendered with data mining in macrothematic maps and statistical analysis. Unstructured information can be shown in like clouds, cluster maps and 2D keyword maps.

Data mining visualisation

Text mining visualisation

Visualisation for both data-mining and text-mining
Mapping visualisations can be used for both text-mining and data-mining results.

Uses
What can patent visualisation highlight:

 Competitors
 Partners
 New innovations
 Technologic environment description
 Networks

Field application:

 R&D strategy management
 Competitive intelligence
 Licensing
 Strategy

References

Computer graphics
Infographics
Patent law
Visualization (graphics)